Austracris proxima is a species of grasshopper in the genus Austracris. It is found in Queensland and New South Wales.

References

Acrididae